A labor dispute is a disagreement between an employer and employees regarding the terms of employment. This could include disputes regarding conditions of employment, fringe benefits, hours of work, tenure, and wages to be negotiated during collective bargaining, or the implementation of already agreed upon terms. It could further concern the association or representation of those who negotiate or seek to negotiate the terms or conditions of employment.

Prevention 
Preventing labor disputes involves coordinating actions at multiple levels, including:

Publicity 

Through the multi-channel and multi-level promotion of policies and regulations to ensure that the employer knows the law, workers' rights activists should know how to deal with the social and cultural environment.

Collective bargaining 
In countries such as the US, the workforce can form unions, strike and collectively bargain with employers. The workers have the right to speak up about employment conditions.

Mediation 
Mediation is one technique for resolving labor disputes. In mediation, the parties meet and seek to resolve their differences. A neutral party attempts to help the disputants to find a mutually acceptable solution.

Arbitration 
Arbitration vests the responsibility of the outcome in the person chosen to be the arbitrator. Each side presents their case, but the resolution does not require agreement from either party.

References

External links
International Labour Organization

Organizational conflict